The Caribbean Community (CARICOM or CC) is an intergovernmental organisation that is a political and economic union of 15 member states (14 nation-states and one dependency) throughout the Americas and Atlantic Ocean. They have primary objectives to promote economic integration and cooperation among its members, ensure that the benefits of integration are equitably shared, and coordinate foreign policy. The organisation was established in 1973, with its four founding members signing the Treaty of Chaguaramas. Its primary activities involve:

 Coordinating economic policies and development planning.
 Devising and instituting special projects for the less-developed countries within its jurisdiction.
 Operating as a regional single market for many of its members (Caricom Single Market).
 Handling regional trade disputes.

The secretariat headquarters is in Georgetown, Guyana. CARICOM is an official United Nations Observer beneficiary.

CARICOM was established by the English-speaking parts of the Caribbean and currently includes all the independent Anglophone island countries plus Belize, Guyana and Montserrat, as well as all other British Caribbean territories and Bermuda as associate members. English was its sole working language into the 1990s. The organisation became multilingual with the addition of Dutch-speaking Suriname in 1995 and the French- and Haitian Creole-speaking Haiti in 2002. Furthermore, it added Spanish as the fourth official language in 2003. In July 2012, CARICOM announced they considered making French and Dutch official languages. In 2001, the heads of government signed a revised Treaty of Chaguaramas that cleared the way to transform the idea of a common market CARICOM into the Caribbean (CARICOM) Single Market and Economy. Part of the revised treaty establishes and implements the Caribbean Court of Justice.

Membership

 CARICOM has 15 full members, five associate members and eight observers. All associate members are British Overseas Territories, and it is currently not established what the role of the associate members will be. The observers are states which engage in at least one of CARICOM's technical committees.

Relationship with Cuba 
In 2017 the Republic of Cuba and the Caribbean Community (CARICOM) signed the "CARICOM-Cuba Trade and Economic Cooperation Agreement" to facilitate closer trade ties.
In December, 2022 President of the Republic of Cuba, H.E. Miguel Díaz-Canel met in Bridgetown, Barbados with the Heads of State and Government of CARICOM. On the occasion of the 8th CARICOM-Cuba Summit to commemorate the 50th Anniversary of establishing diplomatic relations with the independent States of CARICOM and Cuba and the 20th Anniversary of CARICOM-Cuba Day. Cuba also accepted CARICOM's offer to deepen bilateral cooperation and to join robust discussions in the bloc's regional 'Joint Ministerial Taskforce on Food production and Security'.

Organizational Structure
Structures comprised by the overall Caribbean Community (CARICOM).

Under Article 4 CARICOM breaks its 15 member states into two groups: Less Developed Countries (LDCs) and More Developed Countries (MDCs).

The countries of CARICOM which are designated as Less Developed Countries (LDCs) are:

 Antigua and Barbuda
 Belize
 Commonwealth of Dominica
 Grenada
 Republic of Haiti
 Montserrat
 Federation of St. Kitts and Nevis
 St Lucia
 St Vincent and the Grenadines

The countries of CARICOM which are designated as More Developed Countries (MDCs) are:

 Commonwealth of The Bahamas
 Barbados
 Co-operative Republic of Guyana
 Jamaica
 Republic of Suriname
 Republic of Trinidad and Tobago

Chairmanship
The post of Chairman (Head of CARICOM) is held in rotation by the regional Heads of State (for the republics) and Heads of Government (for the realms) of CARICOM's 15 member states. These include Antigua and Barbuda, Belize, Dominica, Grenada, Haiti, Montserrat, St. Kitts and Nevis, St. Lucia, St. Vincent and the Grenadines, The Bahamas, Barbados, Guyana, Jamaica, Suriname, Trinidad and Tobago.

Heads of government
CARICOM contains a quasi-Cabinet of the individual Heads of Government. These heads are given specialised portfolios of responsibility for regional development and integration.

Secretariat
The Secretariat of the Caribbean Community is the Chief Administrative Organ for CARICOM. The Secretary-General of the Caribbean Community is the chief executive and handles foreign and community relations. Five years is the term of office of the Secretary-General, which may be renewed. The Deputy Secretary-General of the Caribbean Community handles human and Social Development. The General Counsel of the Caribbean Community handles trade and economic integration.

The goal statement of the CARICOM Secretariat is: "To provide dynamic leadership and service, in partnership with Community institutions and Groups, toward the attainment of a viable, internationally competitive and sustainable Community, with improved quality of life for all."

Organs and bodies

Community Council
The Community Council comprises ministers responsible for community affairs and any other Minister designated by the member states at their discretion. It is one of the community's principal organs; the other is the Conference of the Heads of Government. Four other organs and three bodies support it.

Institutions
The 25 designated institutions of CARICOM are as follows:

The Caribbean Court of Justice (CCJ) is based in Port of Spain, Trinidad and Tobago and was chiefly developed to act as a settlement unit for disputes on the functioning of the Caribbean (CARICOM) Single Market and Economy (CSME) (known as "original jurisdiction"). In addition, some of the region's Commonwealth Caribbean member states of CARICOM have opted to supplement original jurisdiction with "appellate jurisdiction" which by practice replaces the Privy Council (in London, United Kingdom) with the CCJ.

The Caribbean Public Health Agency (CARPHA) is a regional public health agency headquartered in Trinidad and Tobago which was established by CARICOM leaders in July 2011 and began operation in 2013.

As of 2018, the majority of member states continue to utilize the Privy Council as their final appellate court and three member states do not use the CCJ for either its original jurisdiction or its appellate jurisdiction because they have either not signed the Revised Treaty of Chaguaramas (The Bahamas and Haiti) or are a current United Kingdom Overseas Territory (Montserrat). A handful of various public propositions have been held in several countries of CARICOM polling on public support for transitioning of appellate jurisdiction to the CCJ, and to date the majority of these measures held have failed.

Associate institutions
The seven designated associate institutions of CARICOM are as follows:

Symbols

Standard
The flag of the Caribbean Community was chosen and approved in November 1983 at the Conference of Heads of Government Meeting in Port of Spain, Trinidad. The original design by the firm of WINART Studies in Georgetown, Guyana was substantially modified at the July 1983 Meeting of the Conference of Heads of Government. The flag was first flown on 4 July 1984 in Nassau, The Bahamas at the fifth Meeting of the Conference of Heads of Government.

The flag features a blue background, but the upper part is a light blue representing sky and the lower, a darker blue representing the Caribbean Sea. The yellow circle in the centre represents the sun on which is printed in black the logo of the Caribbean Community, two interlocking Cs. The two Cs are in the form of broken links in a chain, symbolising both unity and a break with the colonial past. The narrow ring of green around the sun represents the vegetation of the region.

Song
For CARICOM's 40th anniversary, a competition to compose an official song or anthem for CARICOM was launched in April 2013 to promote choosing a song that promoted unity and inspired CARICOM identity and pride. A regional panel of judges comprising independent experts in music was nominated by member states and the CARICOM Secretariat. Three rounds of competition condensed 63 entries to a final three, from which judges chose Celebrating CARICOM by Michele Henderson of Dominica in March 2014. Henderson won a US$10,000 prize. Her song was produced by her husband, Roland Delsol Jr., and arranged by Earlson Matthew. It also featured Michael Ferrol on drums and choral input from the St. Alphonsus Choir. It was re-produced for CARICOM by Carl Beaver Henderson of Trinidad and Tobago.

A second-place entry titled My CARICOM came from Jamaican Adiel Thomas who won US$5,000, and a third-place song titled One CARICOM by Carmella Lawrence of St. Kitts and Nevis, won US$2,500. The other songs from the top-ten finalists (in no particular order) were:

 One Region one Caribbean from Anguilla,
 One Caribbean Family from Jamaica, 
 CARICOM’s Light from St. Vincent & the Grenadines,
 We Are CARICOM from Dominica,
 Together As one from Dominica,
 Blessed CARICOM from Jamaica,
 Together We Rise from Jamaica.

The first official performance of Celebrating CARICOM by Henderson took place on Tuesday 1 July 2014 at the opening ceremony for the Thirty-Fifth Regional Meeting of the Conference of Heads of Government in Antigua and Barbuda.

Celebration

CARICOM Day 
The celebration of CARICOM Day is the selected day some Caribbean Community (CARICOM) countries officially recognise the commemorative date of signing of the Treaty of Chaguaramas, the agreement that established CARICOM on July 4, 1973.  The Treaty was signed in Chaguaramas, Trinidad & Tobago by then leaders of: Barbados, Guyana, Jamaica, and Trinidad and Tobago.  CARICOM Day is recognised as an official public holiday in Guyana where the secretariat is based, and is observed on the first Monday of July. The government of Antigua and Barbuda has also implemented CARICOM Day as a holiday.

The day features activities that are organised by government entities such as parades, pageants, and campaigns to educate people about CARICOM.

Caribbean Festival of Arts – CARIFESTA 

Caribbean Festival of Arts, commonly known as CARIFESTA, is an annual festival for promoting arts of the Caribbean with a different country hosting the event each year. It was started to provide a venue to "depict the life of the people of the Region, their heroes, morals, myths, traditions, beliefs, creativity and ways of expression" by fostering a sense of Caribbean unity, and motivating artists by showing the best of their home country. It began under the auspices of Guyana's then President Forbes Burnham in 1972, who was inspired by other singular arts festivals in the region.

History
CARICOM, originally the Caribbean Community and Common Market, was established by the Treaty of Chaguaramas which took effect on 1 August 1973. The first four signatories were Barbados, Jamaica, Guyana and Trinidad and Tobago.

CARICOM superseded the 1965–1972 Caribbean Free Trade Association (CARIFTA) organised to provide a continued economic linkage between the English-speaking countries of the Caribbean after the dissolution of the West Indies Federation, which lasted from 3 January 1958 to 31 May 1962.

A revised Treaty of Chaguaramas established the Caribbean Community including the CARICOM Single Market and Economy (CSME) and was signed by the CARICOM Heads of Government of the Caribbean Community on 5 July 2001 at their Twenty-Second Meeting of the Conference in Nassau, The Bahamas. The revised treaty cleared the way to transform the idea of a common market CARICOM into the Caribbean (CARICOM) Single Market and Economy.

Haiti's membership in CARICOM remained effectively suspended from 29 February 2004 through early June 2006 following the 2004 Haitian coup d'état and the removal of Jean-Bertrand Aristide from the presidency. CARICOM announced that no democratically elected government in CARICOM should have its leader deposed. The fourteen other heads of government sought to have Aristide fly from Africa to Jamaica and share his account of events with them, which infuriated the interim Haitian prime minister, Gérard Latortue, who announced he would take steps to take Haiti out of CARICOM. CARICOM thus voted on suspending the participation of Haitian officials from the councils of CARICOM. Following the presidential election of René Préval, Haitian officials were readmitted and Préval himself gave the opening address at the CARICOM Council of Ministers meeting in July.

Since 2013 the CARICOM-bloc and with the Dominican Republic have been tied to the European Union via an Economic Partnership Agreements signed in 2008 known as CARIFORUM.  The treaty grants all members of the European Union and CARIFORUM equal rights in terms of trade and investment. Under Article 234 of the agreement, the European Court of Justice handles dispute resolution between CARIFORUM and European Union states.

Statistics

Thousands of Caricom nationals live within other member states of the Community.

An estimated 30,000 Jamaicans legally reside in other CARICOM member states, mainly in The Bahamas (6,200), Antigua & Barbuda (estimated 12,000), Barbados and Trinidad & Tobago). Also, an estimated 150 Jamaicans live and work in Montserrat. A November 21, 2013 estimated put 16,958 Jamaicans residing illegally in Trinidad & Tobago, as according to the records of the Office of the Chief Immigration Officer, their entry certificates would have since expired. By October 2014, the estimated Jamaicans residing illegally in Trinidad and Tobago was 19,000 along with an estimated 7,169 Barbadians and 25,884 Guyanese residing illegally. An estimated 8,000 Trinidadians and Tobagonians live in Jamaica.

Barbados hosts a large diaspora population of Guyanese, of whom (in 2005) 5,032 lived there permanently as citizens, permanent residents, immigrants (with immigrant status) and Caricom skilled nationals; 3,200 were residing in Barbados temporarily under work permits, as students, or with "reside and work" status. A further 2,000–3,000 Guyanese were estimated to be living illegally in Barbados at the time. Migration between Barbados and Guyana has deep roots, going back over 150 years, with the most intense period of Barbadian migration to then-British Guiana occurring between 1863 and 1886, although as late as the 1920s and 1930s Barbadians were still leaving Barbados for British Guiana.

Migration between Guyana and Suriname also goes back a number of years. An estimated 50,000 Guyanese had migrated to Suriname by 1986 In 1987 an estimated 30–40,000 Guyanese were in Suriname. Many Guyanese left Suriname in the 1970s and 1980s, either voluntarily by expulsion. Over 5,000 were expelled in January 1985 alone. in the instability Suriname experienced following independence, both coups and civil war. In 2013 an estimated 11,530 Guyanese had emigrated to Suriname and 4,662 Surinamese to Guyana.

Relationship to other supranational Caribbean organisations

Association of Caribbean States

CARICOM was instrumental in the formation of the Association of Caribbean States (ACS) on 24 July 1994. The original idea for the Association came from a recommendation of the West Indian Commission, established in 1989 by the CARICOM heads of state and government. The Commission advocated both deepening the integration process (through the CARICOM Single Market and Economy) and complimenting it through a separate regional organisation encompassing all states in the Caribbean.

CARICOM accepted the commission's recommendations and opened dialogue with other Caribbean states, the Central American states and the Latin American nations of Colombia, Venezuela and Mexico which border the Caribbean, for consultation on the proposals of the West Indian Commission.

At an October 1993 summit, the heads of state and government of CARICOM and the presidents of the then-Group of Three (Colombia, Mexico and Venezuela) formally decided to create an association grouping all states of the Caribbean basin. A work schedule for its formation was adopted. The aim was to create the association in less than a year, an objective which was achieved with the formal creation of the ACS.

Community of Latin American and Caribbean States

CARICOM was also involved in the formation of the Community of Latin American and Caribbean States (CELAC) on 3 December 2010. The idea for CELAC originated at the Rio Group–Caribbean Community Unity Summit on 23 February 2010 in Mexico.  This act caters to the integration of the Americas process, complimenting well-established initiatives of the Organization of American States.

European Union: Economic Partnership Agreements 

Since 2013, the CARICOM-bloc and the Dominican Republic have been tied to the European Union via an Economic Partnership Agreements known as CARIFORUM signed in 2008.  The treaty grants all members of the European Union and CARIFORUM equal rights in terms of trade and investment.  Within the agreement under Article 234, the European Court of Justice also carries dispute resolution mechanisms between CARIFORUM and the states of the European Union.

OHADAC Project

In May 2016, Caricom's court of original jurisdiction, the CCJ, signed a memorandum of understanding (MOU) with the ACP Legal Association based in Guadeloupe recognising and supporting the goals of implementing a harmonised business law framework in the Caribbean through ACP Legal Association's OHADAC Project.

OHADAC is the acronym for the French "Organisation pour l'Harmonisation du Droit des Affaires en les Caraïbes", which translates into English as "Organisation for the Harmonisation of Business Law in the Caribbean". The OHADAC Project takes inspiration from a similar organisation in Africa and aims to enhance economic integration across the entire Caribbean and facilitate increased trade and international investment through unified laws and alternative dispute resolution methods.

Free Trade Agreements 
 List of bilateral free-trade agreements#CARICOM

See also

Projects of the Caribbean Community
CSME
Association of Caribbean States
North American Free Trade Agreement (NAFTA)
North American Union (NAU)
Union of South American Nations (UNASUR)
EU/UK–CARIFORUM
Caribbean Financial Action Task Force
Caribbean Initiative
Caribbean Agricultural Research and Development Institute (CARDI)
Caribbean Accreditation Authority for Education in Medicine and other Health Professions
Caribbean Knowledge and Learning Network
Community of Latin American and Caribbean States
Commonwealth of Nations
Languages of the Caribbean
List of regional organizations by population
Organisation of African, Caribbean and Pacific States
Organization of American States
Petrocaribe
Small Island Developing States
West Indies

References

External links

 
 Official Blog CARICOM Today
 CARICOM Representation Office in Haiti (CROH)
 CARICOM Statistics: Statistical information compiled through the CARICOM Secretariat
 Radio CARICOM: the voice of the Caribbean Community (Press Release)
 Caricom Law: Website and online database of the CARICOM Legislative Drafting Facility (CLDF)
 Caricom Trade Support Programme: Government of Trinidad and Tobago
 CARICOM Trade Support Programme Loan 
 Rapid Exchange System for Dangerous Non-food Consumer Goods (CARREX): Front end for Consumer Product Incident Reporting 
 PANCAP: Pan Caribbean Partnership Against HIV/AIDS
 CARICOM Regional Organisation for Standards and Quality (CROSQ)
  
 EU Style Structure Evident in CARICOM
 Haiti suspends ties with CARICOM
 Jamaica Gleaner News – Haiti could return to CARICOM
 Haiti re-admitted?
 Caricom and Haiti: The raising of the Caribbean's 'Iron Curtain'
 How viable is a single Caribbean currency? Part II
 How viable is a single Caribbean currency? Part III
 The Dominican Republic in Caricom? Yes, we can 
 Bureau recommends re-examination of Dominican Republic's proposed membership in CARICOM 
 Guyana Journal (2007-07): Advancing Integration Between Caricom and Central America
 EDITORIAL: We may just have to dump CARICOM, July 4, 2010, Jamaica Gleaner
 Commentary: Gleaner newspaper suggests disbanding CARICOM , July 5, 2010, Caribbean Net News
 Does Caricom have a future? , 6 July 2010, BBC.co.uk
 That elusive governance structure, 7 July 2010, BBC.co.uk

 
International organizations based in the Caribbean
International economic organizations
International political organizations
Customs unions
Economy of the Caribbean
Politics of the Caribbean
Trade blocs
Intergovernmental organizations established by treaty
Organisations based in the Caribbean
Organizations established in 1973
1970s establishments in the Caribbean
1973 establishments in North America
1973 establishments in South America
1973 in economics
United Nations General Assembly observers